The UK Singles Chart is one of many music charts compiled by the Official Charts Company that calculates the best-selling singles of the week in the United Kingdom. Before 2004, the chart was only based on the sales of physical singles. This list shows singles that peaked in the Top 10 of the UK Singles Chart during 1991, as well as singles which peaked in 1990 and 1992 but were in the top 10 in 1991. The entry date is when the single appeared in the top 10 for the first time (week ending, as published by the Official Charts Company, which is six days after the chart is announced).

One-hundred and forty-six singles were in the top ten in 1991. Nine singles from 1990 remained in the top 10 for several weeks at the beginning of the year, while "Addams Groove" by MC Hammer, "Don't Talk Just Kiss" by Right Said Fred, "Justified & Ancient" by The KLF featuring Tammy Wynette, "Roobarb and Custard" by Shaft and "Too Blind to See It" by Kym Sims were all released in 1991 but did not reach their peak until 1992. "Pray by MC Hammer, "Sadeness (Part I)" by Enigma and "The Grease Megamix" by John Travolta and Olivia Newton-John" were the singles from 1990 to reach their peak in 1991. Twenty-eight artists scored multiple entries in the top 10 in 1991. 2 Unlimited, Blur, Bryan Adams, Nirvana and The Prodigy were among the many artists who achieved their first UK charting top 10 single in 1991.

"Everything I Do (I Do It for You)" broke a record for number of weeks at number-one that had stood since the 1950s, and still remains a record as of 2018. The Bryan Adams song was featured on the soundtrack to the film Robin Hood: Prince of Thieves and was at the top of the charts from 7 July until it was knocked off by U2's "The Fly" on 27 October. The single sold over 1.5 million copies, spent sixteen weeks at number-one and five more weeks in the top ten.

The first number-one single of the year was "Bring Your Daughter...To the Slaughter" by Iron Maiden. Overall, seventeen different singles peaked at number-one in 1991, with Brian May and Roger Taylor (3, including singles with Queen and Hale and Pace) having the most singles hit that position.

Background

Multiple entries
One-hundred and forty-six singles charted in the top 10 in 1991, with one-hundred and thirty-five singles reaching their peak this year.

Twenty-eight artists scored multiple entries in the top 10 in 1991. British acid house duo The KLF, Brian May from Queen and American singer Madonna shared the record for most top ten singles in 1991 with four hit singles each. "3 a.m. Eternal" peaked at number-one for two weeks, and "Justified & Ancient" and "Last Train to Trancentral" both reached number 2. They also reached number 10 in November with "It's Grim Up North" under the moniker of The Justified Ancients of Mu Mu.

Madonna's haul included 1990's number two single "Justify My Love" and "Crazy for You", which reached the same position. "Rescue Me" peaked one place lower, while "Holiday" rounded off her year with a number 5 placing in June.

Two of Brian May's chart hits came with his group – the Christmas number-one double-A side "Bohemian Rhapsody"/"These Are the Days of Our Lives" and fellow chart-topper "Innuendo". He also had a solo top 10 entry, with "Driven by You" making number 6 in December. He was also involved in the Comic Relief charity single "The Stonk" which was credited to the fictional group The Stonkers.

Rock band Guns N' Roses, Australian singer and actress Kylie Minogue and Roger Taylor of the group Queen all had three singles in the top 10. The former's biggest hit of the year, "You Could Be Mine", charted at number 3; their cover of "Live and Let Die" made the top 5, and "Don't Cry" reached number 8. Kylie Minogue had a similar level of success, with "If You Were with Me Now" reaching number 4 in November, and "Shocked" and "What Do I Have to Do" charting at number 6. Roger Taylor was involved on the same two Queen tracks as May, as well as the number-one charity single "The Stonk", all topping the chart.

Cher was one of a number of artists with two top-ten entries, including the number-one single "The Shoop Shoop Song (It's In His Kiss)". Dannii Minogue, James, MC Hammer, Snap! and The Wonder Stuff were among the other artists who had multiple top 10 entries in 1991.

Chart debuts
Seventy-eight artists achieved their first top 10 single in 1991, either as a lead or featured artist. Of these, eleven went on to record another hit single that year: Seal, C+C Music Factory, Color Me Badd, Dannii Minogue, Freedom Williams, James, Right Said Fred, Salt-N-Pepa, The Simpsons, Vic Reeves and The Wonder Stuff,

The following table (collapsed on desktop site) does not include acts who had previously charted as part of a group and secured their first top 10 solo single.

Notes
Seal made his first credited UK top 10 appearance in 1991 with "Crazy", although he was the uncredited vocalist on Adamski's 1990 number-one hit "Killer", which he co-wrote with Adamski. The group Electronic was formed by Bernard Sumner, a guitarist in New Order, and Johnny Marr, formerly of The Smiths. Both had achieved chart success with their respective bands prior to "Get the Message" reaching number 8 in their new venture. Cathy Dennis' only previous solo credit was on the Band Aid II collective single "Do They Know It's Christmas?" in 1989. "Touch Me (All Night Long)" was her first track purely attributed to her to reach the top 10. The Justified Ancients of Mu Mu was one of the pseudonyms used by the group The KLF but the Official Charts Company gives the act a separate credit on their website so it counts as a chart debut.

Songs from films
Original songs from various films entered the top 10 throughout the year. These included "The One and Only" (from Buddy’s Song), "The Shoop Shoop Song (It's in His Kiss)" (Mermaids), "I Wanna Sex You Up" (New Jack City), "Light My Fire" (The Doors), "(Everything I Do) I Do It For You" (Robin Hood: Prince Of Thieves), "You Could Be Mine" (Terminator 2: Judgment Day) and "Bohemian Rhapsody" (Wayne's World).

Charity singles
The Comic Relief single for 1991 was recorded by comedy duo Gareth Hale and Norman Pace (known together as Hale & Pace), alongside The Stonkers, consisting of Brian May (who also produced the track), David Gilmour and Tony Iommi (on guitar), Neil Murray (bass guitar), Cozy Powell, Roger Taylor and Rowan Atkinson's comic persona Mr. Bean  (all on drums). The single, titled "The Stonk" peaked at number-one for one week on 23 March 1991 (week ending).

Best-selling singles
Bryan Adams had the best-selling single of the year with "Everything I Do (I Do It for You)". The single spent twenty-one weeks in the top 10 (including sixteen weeks at number-one), sold over 1.5 million copies and was certified 
2× platinum by the BPI. "Bohemian Rhapsody"/"These Are the Days of Our Lives" by Queen (re-released following the death of lead singer Freddie Mercury) came in second place. Cher's "The Shoop Shoop Song (It's In His Kiss)", "I'm Too Sexy" from Right Said Fred and  "Do the Bartman" by The Simpsons made up the top five. Singles by Jason Donovan, Chesney Hawkes, Vic Reeves and The Wonder Stuff, Oceanic and Color Me Badd were also in the top ten best-selling singles of the year.

"Everything I Do (I Do It for You)" (7) also ranked in the top 10 best-selling singles of the decade.

Top-ten singles
Key

Entries by artist

The following table shows artists who achieved two or more top 10 entries in 1991, including singles that reached their peak in 1990 or 1992 . The figures include both main artists and featured artists, while appearances on ensemble charity records are also counted for each artist.

Notes

 "Don't Talk Just Kiss" reached its peak of number three on 11 January 1992 (week ending).
 "Justified & Ancient" reached its peak of number two on 4 January 1992 (week ending).
 "Too Blind to See It" reached its peak of number five on 11 January 1992 (week ending).
 "Roobarb and Custard" reached its peak of number seven on 11 January 1992 (week ending).
 "You've Lost That Lovin' Feelin'" originally peaked at number-one upon its initial release in 1965. It previously re-entered the top 10 at number 10 in 1969, number 42 in 1977 and number 87 in 1988. "Ebb Tide" originally peaked at number 48 on its initial release in 1966.
 The Children of the Revolution was the name given to various associated acts who collaborated with The KLF.
 "(I've Had) The Time Of My Life" originally peaked at number 6 on its initial release in 1987. It re-entered the top 10 in January 1991 after the film Dirty Dancing premiered on British television. 
 "Hippy Chick" originally peaked outside the top 10 at number 67 upon its initial release in 1990.
 The original version of "Crazy for You" peaked at number 2 upon its release in 1985.
 "Should I Stay or Should I Go" originally peaked outside the top 10 at number 17 upon its initial release in 1982. It was re-released in 1991 after being used in a television advertising campaign for Levi's jeans.
 The original version of "All Right Now" peaked at number 2 upon its release in 1970.
 Released as the official single for Comic Relief.
 The Stonkers was a charity collective made up of various musicians and performers including Brian May, David Gilmour, Tony Iommi, Neil Murray, Cozy Powell, Roger Taylor and Mr. Bean (played by Rowan Atkinson).
 "Sit Down" originally peaked outside the top 10 at number 77 upon on its initial release in 1989.
 The original version of "Tainted Love" peaked at number 1 upon its release in 1981.
 "Light My Fire" originally peaked outside the top 10 at number 49 upon its initial release in 1967.
 "Holiday" first reached the top 10 on its initial release in 1984, peaking at number six It re-entered the top 10 the following year, reaching a new peak of number two.
 Cola Boy was a pseudonym used by the group Saint Etienne for two single releases, including "7 Ways to Love". Janey Lee Grace was an uncredited vocalist on this song.
 "Sunshine on a Rainy Day" originally peaked outside the top 10 at number 53 upon its initial release in 1990.
 "World in Union" was recorded as an anthem for the Rugby World Cup in 1991.
 The Justified Ancients of Mu Mu was a name used by The KLF for their song "It's Grim Up North".
 "Playing with Knives" originally peaked outside the top 10 at number 43 upon its initial release in 1991. It was re-released the same year and reached its new peak of number four.
 Figure includes two top 10 hits with the group Queen.
 Figure includes an appearance on the Comic Relief single "The Stonk" as a member of The Stonkers.
 Figure includes the single "It's Grim Up North" under the pseudonym The Justified Ancients of Mu Mu.
 Figure includes single that peaked in 1992.
 Figure includes single that peaked in 1990.
 Figure includes appearances on The KLF's "3 a.m. Eternal" and "Last Train to Trancentral".
 Figure includes appearances on C+C Music Factory's "Gonna Make You Sweat (Everybody Dance Now)".
 Figure includes single that first charted in 1990 but peaked in 1991.

See also
1991 in British music
List of number-one singles from the 1990s (UK)

References
General

Specific

External links
1991 singles chart archive at the Official Charts Company (click on relevant week)
Official Top 40 best-selling songs of 1991 at the Official Charts Company

1991 record charts
1991 in British music
1991